Catch the Rainbow: The Anthology is a compilation album by the British hard rock band Rainbow, released in 2003.

Track listing

Certifications

References 

Rainbow (rock band) compilation albums
2003 compilation albums
Polydor Records compilation albums